
Field of Dreams is a 1989 American drama-sports-fantasy film.

Field of Dreams may also refer to:

Places
 Field of Dreams (Dubuque County, Iowa),  baseball field and pop-culture tourist attraction built originally for the 1989 movie of the same name

Events
 MLB at Field of Dreams, a recurring Major League Baseball game played at the Field of Dreams complex in Dubuque County, Iowa

Music
 Field of Dreams (album), 2013 studio album by Seduce the Heaven
 "Field of Dreams" (song), a 1997 song by Force & Styles
 "Field of Dreams", a song by Do As Infinity from the 2004 album 8

See also
 
 The Dreaming Fields (album), a 2011 album by Matraca Berg 
 "The Dreaming Fields", a song from the like-named album
 "Field of Hopes and Dreams", a track from Deltarune Chapter 1 OST
 In the Fields of Dreams, a 1940 Finnish drama film
 Our Field of Dreams, a Japanese manga series published in the 1990s